The Partizanskaya (formerly Сучан Suchan) is a river in Primorsky Krai. Its sources are in South Sikhote-Alin in Partizansky District; the mouth empties into Nakhodka Bay in the Sea of Japan.

References

Rivers of Primorsky Krai
Drainage basins of the Sea of Japan